John Ringo (born March 22, 1963) is an American science fiction and military fiction author.  He has had several New York Times best sellers.  His books range from straightforward science fiction to a mix of military and political thrillers.  He has over seven million copies of his books in print, and his works have been translated into seven different languages.

Life and career
Ringo's father "was a civil engineer with an international firm"; before Ringo graduated in 1981 from Winter Park High School in Winter Park, Florida, he had spent time in 23 foreign countries, attending classes at fourteen schools. Among the countries he spent the most time in were Greece, Iran and Switzerland before he settled with his parents and six siblings in Alabama. This amount of travel brought what he refers to as a "wonderful appreciation of the oneness of humanity and a permanent aversion to foreign food."

After graduation, Ringo joined the United States Army and rose to the rank of Specialist in the 82nd Airborne Division. During his four years of active duty, he was assigned to the 1st Battalion, 508th Parachute Infantry Regiment, reflagged into 3rd Battalion, 505th Parachute Infantry Regiment when the 82nd reorganized its 3rd Brigade, plus two years of reserve duty with the Florida National Guard. Among his awards are the Combat Infantryman Badge, Parachutist Badge, Army Commendation Medal, Good Conduct Medal, Armed Forces Expeditionary Medal for his participation in the 1983 United States invasion of Grenada, and the National Defense Service Medal.

After discharge, Ringo earned an associate degree in marine biology. However, he quickly discovered that marine biology would only "pay for beans" and became a database manager to support his wife and two daughters. In 1999, he had the idea for a science fiction story that involved an alien invasion and a military response that became the novel A Hymn Before Battle, the title referring to Rudyard Kipling's poem "Hymn Before Action", quoted extensively throughout the book. He submitted the novel to Baen Books. The book was initially rejected, but the publisher Jim Baen, through his discussion with Ringo on the Baen's Bar website forum, personally took a look at the novel and quickly bought it.

The success of the book and its sequels allowed Ringo to quit his job and become a full-time writer. As of 2015, John Ringo had written 46 novels, some with co-authors David Weber, Michael Z. Williamson, Julie Cochrane, Linda Evans, Travis S. Taylor, and Tom Kratman. One of the appeals of his works is his inclusion of fans' names into novels as "red shirts" who die gloriously. He also has often integrated elements of the 82nd Airborne into his works: 2nd Battalion, 325th Airborne Infantry in A Hymn Before Battle, his old 1/508th Parachute Infantry in Yellow Eyes, and the 555th "Triple Nickels/Black Panthers" in Gust Front and its sequels.

He has also written a number of op-ed pieces for the New York Post, and been a guest commentator for Fox News and National Geographic.

In 2012, he was presented with the Phoenix Award at DeepSouthCon 50 in Huntsville, Alabama, in recognition of his contributions to science fiction literature.

Ringo is considered the originator of the anti–political correctness slogan "get woke, go broke", citing political tensions in a fan convention following the 2000 United States presidential election and declining interest in organizations that embrace progressive cultural shifts. The term suggests that organizations that embrace social justice initiatives ("getting woke") will drive away significant, mostly conservative or apolitical fans and their interests, and thus lose money ("going broke").

Works

See also
 Sluggy Freelance, a webcomic featured in the Posleen Series books; a SheVa tank is named after the character Bun-bun. A character styled after Bun-bun is featured in The Council Wars series.
 Schlock Mercenary, a webcomic set far into the future. The Troy Rising series is inspired by the universe of Schlock Mercenary at the point of first contact.  Also, a number of characters in the Black Tide Rising series state that they are fans of the Schlock webcomic, and often offer variations on the comic's "Rule 37" ("There is no 'overkill.' There is only 'open fire' and 'I need to reload!).
 The Crüxshadows, mentioned in the Paladin of Shadows series; the protagonist makes numerous mentions of the song "Winterborn" in particular. The main characters in Claws That Catch also play "Return" in order to defeat the aliens. The book Eye of the Storm quotes the song of the same name a few times. In the novel Von Neumann's War, the song "Citadel" is the anthem of the soldiers and it is played during the final showdown. The Black Tide Rising series also quotes the Crüxshadows extensively.

References

External links

 Fleet Strike: John Ringo's homepage
 
 SF Encyclopedia entry
 Fantastic Fiction Author Page

Living people
1963 births
20th-century American novelists
21st-century American novelists
American fantasy writers
American male novelists
American science fiction writers
Military science fiction writers
American male short story writers
20th-century American short story writers
21st-century American short story writers
20th-century American male writers
21st-century American male writers
United States Army soldiers